Estonia was represented by Ines, with the song "Once in a Lifetime", at the 2000 Eurovision Song Contest which took place on 13 May in Stockholm. "Once in a Lifetime" was chosen as the Estonian entry at the national final, Eurolaul, on 5 February.

Before Eurovision

Eurolaul 2000 
The final was held at the studios of broadcaster ETV in Tallinn, hosted by Marko Reikop. Ten songs took part with the winner being chosen by a 10-member "expert" international jury.

At Eurovision 
On the night of the final Ines performed 4th in the running order, following the United Kingdom and preceding France. Estonia had picked up 98 points and placed 4th of the 24 entries, their highest finish up to that time. Later, Ines claimed in a 2002 BBC documentary that she had been widely criticised on her return to Estonia, where people had been fully expecting a victory and felt let down that she had been unable to deliver it. The five backing vocalists that joined Ines were Maiken, Kaire Vilgats, Jelena Juzvik, Pearu Paulus and Tanel Padar. Eurovision Song Contest 2000 was televised in Estonia on ETV with the commentary by Marko Reikop. The contest was watched by a total of 545 thousand viewers in Estonia with the market share of 46,6%.

Voting

References 

2000
Countries in the Eurovision Song Contest 2000
Eurovision